We Want Billy! is a live album by Billy Fury, recorded in 1963, and backed by The Tornados. It was recorded in Decca's Studio No. 3.

Track listing
Side 1
"Sweet Little Sixteen"
"Baby Come On"
"That's All Right"
"Wedding Bells"
"Sticks and Stones"
"Unchain My Heart"
"I'm Moving On"
Side 2
"Just Because"
"Halfway to Paradise"
"I'd Never Find Another You"
"Once Upon a Dream"
"Last Night Was Made for Love"
"Like I've Never Been Gone"
"When Will You Say I Love You"

References

External links
[ Allmusic.com - album review]

1963 live albums
Billy Fury albums
Decca Records live albums